In astrodynamics, the characteristic energy is a measure of the excess specific energy over that required to just barely escape from a massive body. The units are length2 time−2, i.e. velocity squared, or energy per mass.

Every object in a 2-body ballistic trajectory has a constant specific orbital energy  equal to the sum of its specific kinetic and specific potential energy:

As an object in an escape trajectory moves outward, its kinetic energy decreases as its potential energy (which is always negative) increases, maintaining a constant sum.

Note that C3 is twice the specific orbital energy  of the escaping object.

Non-escape trajectory
A spacecraft with insufficient energy to escape will remain in a closed orbit (unless it intersects the central body), with

where
 is the standard gravitational parameter,
 is the semi-major axis of the orbit's ellipse.

If the orbit is circular, of radius r, then

Parabolic trajectory
A spacecraft leaving the central body on a parabolic trajectory has exactly the energy needed to escape and no more:

Hyperbolic trajectory
A spacecraft that is leaving the central body on a hyperbolic trajectory has more than enough energy to escape:

where
 is the standard gravitational parameter,
 is the semi-major axis of the orbit's hyperbola (which may be negative in some convention).

Also,

where  is the asymptotic velocity at infinite distance.  Spacecraft's velocity approaches  as it is further away from the central object's gravity.

Examples
MAVEN, a Mars-bound spacecraft, was launched into a trajectory with a characteristic energy of 12.2 km2/s2 with respect to the Earth. When simplified to a two-body problem, this would mean the MAVEN escaped Earth on a hyperbolic trajectory slowly decreasing its speed towards . However, since the Sun's gravitational field is much stronger than Earth's, the two-body solution is insufficient. The characteristic energy with respect to Sun was negative, and MAVEN – instead of heading to infinity – entered an elliptical orbit around the Sun. But the maximal velocity on the new orbit could be approximated to 33.5 km/s by assuming that it reached practical "infinity" at 3.5 km/s and that such Earth-bound "infinity" also moves with Earth's orbital velocity of about 30 km/s.

The InSight mission to Mars launched with a C3 of 8.19 km2/s2. The Parker Solar Probe (via Venus) plans a maximum C3 of 154 km2/s2.

C3 (km2/s2) to get from Earth to various planets: Mars 12, Jupiter 80, Saturn or Uranus 147. To Pluto (with its orbital inclination) needs about 160–164 km2/s2.

See also
Specific orbital energy
Orbit
Parabolic trajectory
Hyperbolic trajectory

References

Footnotes

Astrodynamics
Orbits
Energy (physics)